Macbeth is a 1961 Canadian television film adaptation of William Shakespeare's Macbeth starring Sean Connery in his first North-American role (and his first significant Shakespearean role). The screenplay was adapted by Paul Almond who also directed the production. It was originally broadcast by CBC in five parts on 30 November, 5 December, 7 December, 12 December, and 14 December 1961; and then re-edited into a 90-minute single episode aired in 1962 as part of the CBC's Festival series.

Plot
The Scottish lord Macbeth chooses evil as the way to fulfill his ambition for power. He commits regicide to become king and then furthers his moral descent with a reign of murderous terror to stay in power, eventually plunging the country into civil war. In the end, he loses everything that gives meaning and purpose to his life before losing his life itself.

Cast

 Sean Connery – Macbeth
 Zoe Caldwell – Lady Macbeth
 William Needles – Banquo
 Ted Follows – Macduff
 Robin Gammell – Malcolm
 Powys Thomas – King Duncan
 Sharon Acker – Lady Macduff

Production 
This adaptation was filmed in black and white in the CBC Studios at 1140 Yonge Street in Toronto, Ontario.

References

External links 

 

1961 drama films
1961 television films
1961 films
Films based on Macbeth
Films directed by Paul Almond
CBC Television original films
English-language Canadian films
Canadian drama television films
1960s Canadian films